This article is a list of equipment of the Royal Thai Army.

Small arms and light weapons

Armoured vehicles

Unarmoured vehicles

Artillery

Air defence

Radar system

Aircraft

References

Thai
Royal Thai Army
Equipment